Christin Steuer (born 6 March 1983 in West Berlin, West Germany) is a diver from Germany who won the bronze medal at the 2007 and 2011 World Aquatics Championships competing in the women's 10 meter synchronized platform.  She has also won a European bronze medal in this discipline.  She has also competed at three Olympics in the women's 10 m individual event (2004, 2008 and 2012) and in the women's 10 m synchronized event (2012).

In 2012, she posed nude for a special number of the German edition of the Playboy magazine, along with other German female Olympic athletes.

References

External links 
 
 
 
 

German female divers
Living people
Divers at the 2008 Summer Olympics
Divers at the 2004 Summer Olympics
Divers at the 2012 Summer Olympics
Olympic divers of Germany
1983 births
World Aquatics Championships medalists in diving
20th-century German women
21st-century German women